Bichun-e Pain (also Romanized as Bīchūn-e Pā’īn and Bīchūn Pāīn; also known as Bīchūn-e Soflá) is a village in Valanjerd Rural District, in the Central District of Borujerd County, Lorestan Province, Iran. At the 2006 census, its population was 829, in 200 families.

References 

Towns and villages in Borujerd County